Minority Large is the debut studio album by English rapper Deeder Zaman, released on 28 January 2008 by Beat Records.

Composition and release
Deeder Zaman took on the roles of writer, programmer, vocalist, guitarist and keyboardist on Minority Large. The album features dub, hip-hop, electronica and reggae. It was released as a CD in Japan and on iTunes.

Critical response
Mat Ward of Green Left Weekly said, "Zaman's debut solo album, Minority Large, switched his musical focus from Asia to Africa." Sreekanth of EthnoTechno said, "Seventeen tracks is an awful lot of time to keep someone's attention but somehow under Deeder Zaman's guidance, it does not seem long enough."

Track listing

Personnel

Musicians and vocals
Dennis Rootical – bass
Deeder Zaman – guitar, keyboards, melodica, percussion
Louis Beckett – guitar, piano
Clotaire K – oud
P. Brooke – ukulele

Vocals
Deeder Zaman
Passion

Technical
Deeder Zaman – mix engineer (tracks 1 to 17)
Louis Beckett – mix engineer (tracks 2 to 17)
Brendan Lynch – mix engineer (track 1)
Al Scott – mastering engineer

References

External links

2008 debut albums
Deeder Zaman albums
Beat Records albums